The women's discus throw event at the 2008 Olympic Games took place on 15–18 August at the Beijing Olympic Stadium.

Summary
The qualifying standards were 61.00 m (200.13 ft) (A standard) and 59.00 m (193.57 ft) (B standard).

On the sixth throw of the competition, world leader Stephanie Brown Trafton settled the results, throwing .  The next thrower in the ring Yarelis Barrios threw 63.17m which would be good enough for second place.  Barrios improved to 63.64m in the second round to assure her hold on second place.  The final thrower in the first round, Olena Antonova pulled into third position, which she gradually improved to her best of 62.59 in the fifth round.  Through the rest of the competition, Brown Trafton didn't land another throw that would be competitive with the leaders, but she didn't need to.  Song Aimin struggled with the worst throw of the opening round and was flirting with elimination until her third round throw which put her into fourth place.  Song solidified that position with a fifth round 62.20, which would later become relevant.

Eight years after the event, the IOC reanalyzed doping samples of silver medalist Yarelis Barrios and disqualified her for having the masking agent acetazolamide in her sample.  She was stripped of her medal.  If the IOC reallocates medals, Antonova stands to advance to the silver medal and Song would get bronze. On May 24, 2017, medals were reallocated.

Schedule
All times are China standard time (UTC+8)

Records 
Prior to this competition, the existing world and Olympic records were as follows.

No new world or Olympic records were set for this event.

Results

Qualifying round 

Qualification: 61.50 (Q) or at least 12 best performers (q) advance to the Final.

Final

References 

Athletics at the 2008 Summer Olympics
Discus throw at the Olympics
2008 in women's athletics
Women's events at the 2008 Summer Olympics